Rockowitz is a surname. Notable people with the surname include:

 Bruce Rockowitz (born 1958), Canadian businessman
 Glenn Rockowitz (born 1970), American writer, filmmaker, comedian, and voice actor